Coleophora minipunctella is a moth of the family Coleophoridae.

References

minipunctella
Moths described in 1997